Apollon Eretria Football Club is a Greek football club, based in Eretria, Euboea, Greece.

Honours

Domestic Titles and honours

 Euboea FCA champion: 4
 1986-87, 1994-95, 1996-97, 2017-18
 Euboea FCA Cup Winners: 2
 1986-87, 1990-91
 Euboea FCA Super Cup Winners: 1
 2018

References

Football clubs in Central Greece
Euboea (regional unit)
Gamma Ethniki clubs